Jessica is a genus of South American anyphaenid sac spiders first described by Antônio Domingos Brescovit in 1997.

Species
 it contains twelve species:
Jessica campesina (Bauab, 1979) – Brazil
Jessica eden Brescovit, 1999 – Venezuela
Jessica erythrostoma (Mello-Leitão, 1939) – Colombia to Argentina
Jessica fidelis (Mello-Leitão, 1922) – Brazil, Bolivia, Paraguay, Argentina
Jessica glabra (Keyserling, 1891) – Brazil, Paraguay, Argentina
Jessica itatiaia Brescovit, 1999 – Brazil
Jessica osoriana (Mello-Leitão, 1922) – Brazil, Paraguay, Argentina
Jessica pachecoi Brescovit, 1999 – Brazil
Jessica puava Brescovit, 1999 – Brazil
Jessica rafaeli Brescovit, 1999 – Brazil
Jessica renneri Brescovit, 1999 – Brazil
Jessica sergipana Brescovit, 1999 – Brazil

References

Anyphaenidae
Araneomorphae genera